Gonja may refer to:
Gonja people
Gonja language
Ranjan Ramanayake

See also
 East Gonja District
 North East Gonja District
 West Gonja District

Language and nationality disambiguation pages